The Rob Roy 23 is an American trailerable sailboat, that was designed by Edward S. Brewer and first built in 1980. The design is out of production.

Production
The boat was built by Marine Concepts in Tarpon Springs, Florida, United States. The design is a cabin version of the Sun Seeker 23 daysailer, which was also built by Marine Concepts.

Design

The Rob Roy 23 is a small recreational centerboard sailboat, built predominantly of fiberglass, with wood trim. It is a fractional Gunter rigged yawl and has an internally-mounted spade-type rudder and an  "L"-shaped centerboard keel. It displaces  and carries  of ballast.

The boat is normally fitted with a small  well-mounted outboard motor for docking and maneuvering.

The design has sleeping accommodation for two or three people, depending on layout. It has two straight settee berths in the main cabin and the option of a third berth angled in the bow. The galley is located on both sides in the bow. The galley equipped with a two-burner stove to port and a sink to starboard. The head in the forward part of the bow.

Operational history

In a 2010 review Steve Henkel wrote, "there's nothing like a yawl rig to give character to a small sailboat. Add a canoe stern, comfortable accommodations for two (or three if you opt for a single berth forward
squeezed in next to the head), reasonably good construction and finishing, and you have the makings of a classic small yacht. Ted Brewer, whose life has been spent designing comfortable cruising boats, has succeeded here in his efforts to create just such a boat; and Marine Concepts, which left the business in 2006, did a good job of building her. Rob Roy had a relatively long production run, from 1983 to 2000, with a hiatus from 1994 to 1997. Best features: She's a salty-looking boat, with practical features such as a tabernacle for the main mast, an unstayed mizzen, an L-shaped centerboard that frees up cabin space by keeping the board trunk small and out of the way, and an in-cockpit engine well. And of course, as a yawl she has the advantage of easily shortening sail when it comes on to blow. Worst features: She is not very fast or weatherly versus her comp[etitor]s, partly a result of her divided rig and oddly shaped centerboard, though she does fine on a reach."

See also

List of sailing boat types
Similar sailboats
Beneteau First 235
Bluenose one-design sloop
Hunter 23
O'Day 23
Paceship 23
Paceship PY 23
Precision 23
Schock 23
Sonic 23
Stone Horse
Watkins 23

References

External links

1980s sailboat type designs
Sailing yachts
Trailer sailers
Sailboat type designs by Edward S. Brewer
Sailboat types built by Marine Concepts